Charles David Michel (born April 7, 1963) is a former United States Coast Guard admiral who last served as the 30th vice commandant of the U.S. Coast Guard. He is the first vice commandant to hold the rank of admiral while in office. Originally a vice admiral when he assumed office on August 6, 2015, Michel was promoted to four-star admiral on May 24, 2016 when the Coast Guard Authorization Act of 2015 elevated the statutory rank for the position to admiral. Michel is also the first career judge advocate in any of the armed forces to achieve four-star rank. Michel retired from the Coast Guard on May 24, 2018 after over 33 years of service.

Early life and education
Michel was born in Lawton, Oklahoma, in 1963 and graduated from Brandon High School at Brandon, Florida in 1981. Michel graduated from the U.S. Coast Guard Academy with a degree in marine engineering with high honors in 1985. He also graduated in 1992 summa cum laude from the University of Miami School of Law as the salutatorian and is a member of The Florida Bar.

Career
Other assignments have included a tour as staff attorney for the Eighth Coast Guard District at New Orleans, Louisiana and assignments at Coast Guard Headquarters in Washington, D.C. as head of the operations division the Office of Maritime and International Law and a later tour as chief of the same office. Michel also served a tour as legislative counsel for the office of congressional and governmental affairs. His flag assignments include director, governmental and public affairs, military advisor to the Secretary of Homeland Security, director, Joint Interagency Task Force South, deputy commander, U.S. Coast Guard Atlantic Area, and  deputy commandant of operations at Coast Guard Headquarters.

Awards and decorations

Dates of rank

Personal life
In addition to his military awards, Michel was the American Bar Association Young Lawyer of the Year for the Coast Guard in 1995, and the Judge Advocates Association Career Armed Services Attorney of the Year for the U.S. Coast Guard in 2000. Also, Michel has received the USCG Public Service Commendation certificate.

Notes
Citations

References cited

External links

United States Coast Guard Academy alumni
University of Miami School of Law alumni
Living people
Place of birth missing (living people)
People from Lawton, Oklahoma
1963 births
People from Brandon, Florida
Recipients of the Coast Guard Distinguished Service Medal
Vice Commandants of the United States Coast Guard